Gwapings Live! is a Philippine television variety show broadcast by GMA Network. Hosted by Mark Anthony Fernandez, Jomari Yllana, Eric Fructuoso and Jao Mapa, it premiered on October 4, 1992. The show concluded on October 10, 1993 with a total of 51 episodes.

References

1992 Philippine television series debuts
1993 Philippine television series endings
Filipino-language television shows
GMA Network original programming
Philippine variety television shows